Beryu (also Romanized as Beryū, Berioo, and Berīū) is a village in Eshkanan Rural District, Eshkanan District, Lamerd County, Fars Province, Iran. At the 2006 census, its population was 336, in 65 families.

References 

Populated places in Lamerd County